Pedilus is a genus of fire-colored beetles in the family Pyrochroidae. There are at least 20 described species in Pedilus.

Species
These 23 species belong to the genus Pedilus:

 Pedilus abnormis (Horn, 1874) g b
 Pedilus bardii (Horn, 1874) b
 Pedilus canaliculatus (LeConte, 1866) g b
 Pedilus cavatus Fall, 1915 b
 Pedilus cyanipennis Bland, 1864 g
 Pedilus elegans (Hentz, 1830) g b
 Pedilus flabellatus (Horn, 1883) g b
 Pedilus flexiventris Fall, 1915 b
 Pedilus fuscus Fisher von Waldheim, 1822 g
 Pedilus impressus (Say, 1826) g
 Pedilus inconspicuus (Horn, 1874) g b
 Pedilus joanae b (manuscript name)
 Pedilus labiatus (Say, 1827) b
 Pedilus laevicollis Reitter, 1901 g
 Pedilus lewisii (Horn, 1871) b
 Pedilus longilobus Fall, 1915 g
 Pedilus lugubris Say i c g b
 Pedilus oregonus Fall, 1915 g
 Pedilus parvicollis Fall, 1919 b
 Pedilus punctulatus LeConte, 1851 g b
 Pedilus rubricollis Motschulsky, 1858 g
 Pedilus terminalis (Say, 1827) g b
 Pedilus weberi Reitter, 1901 g

Data sources: i = ITIS, c = Catalogue of Life, g = GBIF, b = Bugguide.net

References

Further reading

External links

 

Pyrochroidae